Portales may refer to:

People
 Diego Portales, a Chilean politician

Places
 Portales, New Mexico, a city from the United States
 Portales Forest Reserve, in New Mexico

Other uses
 Diego Portales University, a Chilean University
 Portales metro station, in Mexico City
 Portales Municipal Airport, an airport of the United States